Enaliktidae is an extinct family of elongate arthropods known from the Silurian and Devonian periods, containing two genera, Enalikter and Bundenbachiellus. Taxonomic positions of the family is uncertain and in its original description it was attributed to the Megacheira, a group of arthropods otherwise known from the Cambrian period, due to them possessing uniramous frontal appendages with whip-like exensions, similar to the great appendages of megacheirans belonging to the family Leanchoiliidae like Leanchoilia. However, their placement as megacheirans has been questioned, as they arguably lack any defining apomorphies of that group, as whether the great appendages of megacheirans and the frontal appendages of enaliktids are homologous is unclear.

References 

Megacheira
Enigmatic prehistoric animal genera
Arthropod families